Dawūd al-Qayṣarī (c.1260-c.1350) was an early Ottoman Sufi scholar, philosopher and mystic. He was born in Kayseri, in central Anatolia and was the student of the Iranian scholar, Abd al-Razzaq Kāshānī (d. 1329).

He was the author of over a dozen philosophical texts, many of which are still important textbooks in Shi'ite religious schools. The most important is the commentary on Ibn al-'Arabi's Fusus al-Hikam and his criticism of Ibn al-Farid's poetry. Sultan Orhan Gazi built a school for him in the town of İznik, the first case of an Ottoman state-established medrese.

See also
 Akbariyya

References

Sufi mystics
Akbarian Sufis
14th-century Muslim theologians
Non-fiction writers from the Ottoman Empire